Agenda was an Irish weekly current affairs television programme broadcast by TV3 between 1999 and 2004.  Produced by Fastnet Films, the programme focused on the top current affairs and business issues of the week.

Agenda returned to TV3 in October 2016.

References

Irish television news shows
Virgin Media Television (Ireland) original programming